David Crouse (born 1971 in Boston, Massachusetts) is a short story writer and teacher. Crouse's work explores issues of identity and alienation, and his stories are populated with characters living on the fringes of American society. The Flannery O'Connor Award for Short Fiction was awarded to him in 2005 for his first collection of short stories, Copy Cats. Published in 2008, his most recent collection of stories, The Man Back There, was awarded the Mary McCarthy Prize.

He has been published extensively in the literary journal circuit, with stories appearing in The Greensboro Review, Chelsea, Quarterly West, and The Beloit Fiction Journal. With a collection of three novellas entitled Continuity nearing completion, he has begun work on his first novel.

Having helped to establish a creative writing program at Chester College of New England, a renowned liberal arts college located in Chester, New Hampshire, Crouse returned to the University of Alaska Fairbanks, which awarded him his MFA in Creative Writing in 1996. He continues to teach creative writing at both the undergraduate and graduate level.

He has written in the comic book genre, with his work appearing in The Darkhorse Book of the Dead, (Darkhorse Comics).

Books by David Crouse 

Copy Cats (2005)

The Man Back There (2008)

References

External links 
 David Crouse official site
 University of Alaska Fairbanks English Department’s official site
 University of Washington English Department's official site

1971 births
Writers from Boston
American short story writers
University of Alaska Fairbanks alumni
Living people